The riddarasögur (literally 'sagas of knights', also known in English as 'chivalric sagas', 'romance-sagas', 'knights' sagas', 'sagas of chivalry') are Norse prose sagas of the romance genre. Starting in the thirteenth century with Norse translations of French chansons de geste and Latin romances and histories, the genre expanded in Iceland to indigenous creations in a similar style.

While the riddarasögur were widely read in Iceland for many centuries they have traditionally been regarded as popular literature inferior in artistic quality to the Icelanders' sagas and other indigenous genres. Receiving little attention from scholars of Old Norse literature, many remain untranslated.

The production of chivalric sagas in Scandinavia was focused on Norway in the thirteenth century and then Iceland in the fourteenth. Vernacular Danish and Swedish romances came to prominence rather later and were generally in verse; the most famous of these are the Eufemiavisorna, themselves predominantly translations of Norwegian translations of Continental European romances.

Terminology
The term riddarasögur (singular riddarasaga) occurs in Mágus saga jarls where there is a reference to "Frásagnir...svo sem...Þiðreks saga, Flóvenz saga eðr aðrar riddarasögur", "narratives such as the saga of Þiðrekr, the saga of Flóvent, or other knights' sagas". Another technical term sometimes encountered is lygisögur (singular lygisaga), "lie sagas", applied to fictional chivalric and legendary sagas.

Translations
The first known Old Norse translations of European romances occurred under the patronage of king Hákon Hákonarson of Norway, and seem to have been part of a programme of Europeanisation. The earliest dated work is a 1226 translation by one Brother Robert of Tristan by Thomas of Britain. The Old Norse work, Tristrams saga ok Ísöndar, is especially valuable since the original Old French poem is only preserved in fragments. Elis saga ok Rósamundu, a translation of  Elie de Saint Gille, is similarly attributed to an Abbot Robert, presumably the same man having been promoted within his order. King Hákon also commissioned Möttuls saga, an adaptation of Le mantel mautaillé, Ívens saga, a reworking of Chrétien de Troyes's Yvain and Strengleikar, a collection of ballads principally by Marie de France.

Works in similar style, which may also have been commissioned by King Hákon, are Parcevals saga, Valvens þáttr and Erex saga, all derived from the works of Chrétien de Troyes. Karlamagnús saga is a compilation of more disparate origin, dealing with Charlemagne and his twelve paladins and drawing on historiographical material as well as chansons de geste. Other works believed to derive from French originals are Bevers saga, Flóres saga ok Blankiflúr, Flóvents saga and Partalopa saga.

Pseudo-historical works translated from Latin are Alexanders saga (a translation of Alexandreis), Amícus saga ok Amilíus (based on Vincent of Beauvais's Speculum historiale), Breta sögur (a translation of Historia Regum Britanniae), and Trójumanna saga (a translation of De excidio Troiae). Also pseudo-historical, Þiðreks saga af Bern is unusual in having been translated from German.

These Old Norse translations have been characterised by Margaret Clunies Ross thus:
The Old Norse term riddarasaga ... covers what were a number of genres in Latin, French and Anglo-Norman, but common to all of them are their courtly setting, their interest in kingship, and their concerns with the ethics of chivalry and courtly love. It seems, however, from a comparison between the French originals and the Old Norse translations of courtly romances, such as Chrétien de Troyes' Erec et Enide (Erex saga), Yvain (Ívens saga) and Perceval (Parcevals saga and Velvens þáttr), that the translators who supplied King Hákon's court and others in Norway and Iceland who enjoyed such sagas offered an independent rewriting of their sources. It is notable that they did not convey a number of key aspects of Chrétien's somewhat ironic perspective on courtly society. This may well be because most of the translators were probably clerics, but it is also likely to reflect traditional Norse tastes and narrative conventions. In particular, most elements of explicit eroticism have been deleted from the riddarasögur, as have much comedy and irony in the treatment of the protagonists' behaviour. Instead, the narratives are largely exemplary and didactic, in large part because the Scandinavian translators refrained from using two essential narrative devices of their sources, namely the internal monologue, which conveyed the private thoughts and feelings of the characters, and the intrusive involvement of the narrator, which was a vehicle for conveying a nuanced and often ironic point of view.

Original compositions

Inspired by translated Continental romances, Icelanders began enthusiastically composing their own romance-sagas, apparently around the later thirteenth century, with the genre flourishing from the fourteenth century. The rise of the genre has been associated with Iceland coming under Norwegian rule in the 1260s, and the consequent need for Icelandic ecclesiastical and secular elites to explore Icelanders' new identities as vassals to a king. These new political formations particularly affected the marriage market for elite Icelanders, making gender politics a central theme of many romances. One seminal composition, directly or indirectly influential on many subsequent sagas, seems to have been Klári saga, whose prologue states that it was translated from a Latin metrical work which Jón Halldórsson Bishop of Skálholt found in France, but which is now thought to have been composed by Jón from scratch. Jón's work seems to have been one of the inspirations for the fourteenth-century North Icelandic Benedictine School which, while most clearly associated with religious writing, also seems to have involved romance-writing.

Post-medieval reception

Chivalric sagas remained in widespread manuscript circulation in Iceland into the twentieth century. They were often reworked as rímur, and new chivalric sagas in the same mould as medieval ones continued to be composed into the nineteenth century.

Particularly during the eighteenth century, some chivalric sagas were taken to be useful historical sources for the history of Sweden and Denmark, underpinning their imperial aspirations, and were printed in these countries. One prominent example is Erik Julius Biörner's Nordiska kämpa dater of 1737.

Modern scholarship 
The most comprehensive guide to the manuscripts, editions, translations, and secondary literature of this body of sagas is Kalinke and Mitchell's 1985 Bibliography of Old Norse-Icelandic Romances.

The genre received a fairly substantial survey in Margaret Schlauch's 1934 Romance in Iceland, since when the main monograph studies of the genre have been Astrid van Nahl's Originale Riddarasögur als Teil altnordischer Sagaliteratur, Jürg Glauser's Isländische Märchensagas, Marianne Kalinke's Bridal-Quest Romance in Medieval Iceland, and Geraldine Barnes's The Bookish Riddarasögur.

List of chivalric sagas

Translated into Old Norse
Kalinke and Mitchell's Bibliography of Old Norse-Icelandic Romances lists the following translated riddarasögur:

 Alexanders saga (Alexandreis)
 Amícus saga ok Amilíus (Vincent of Beauvais's Speculum historiale)
 Bevis saga (Boeve de Haumtone)
 Breta sögur (Historia Regum Britanniae)
 Elis saga ok Rósamundu (Elie de Saint-Gille)
 Erex saga (Érec et Énide)
 Flóres saga ok Blankiflúr (Floire et Blanchiflor)
 Flóvents saga (Floovant)
 Ívens saga (Yvain, le Chevalier au Lion)
 Karlamagnús saga
 Möttuls saga (La mantel mautaillé)
 Pamphilus ok Galathea (Pamphilus de amore)
 Parcevals saga and Valvens þáttr (Perceval, le Conte du Graal)
 Partalopa saga (Partonopeus de Blois)
 Strengleikar
 Forræða 'prologue'
 Bisclaretz ljóð (Bisclavret)
 Chetovel (Chaitivel)
 Desire (Desiré)
 Douns ljóð (Doon)
 Eskja (Le Fresne (lai))
 Equitan (Equitan)
 Geitarlauf (Chevrefoil)
 Grelent (Graelent)
 Guiamars ljóð (Guigemar)
 Guruns ljóð (source unknown)
 Januals ljóð (Lanval)
 Jonet (Yonec)
 Laustik (Laüstic)
 Leikara ljóð (Lecheor)
 Milun (Milun)
 Naboreis (Nabaret)
 Ricar hinn gamli (source unknown)
 Strandar ljóð (source unknown)
 Tidorel (Tydorel)
 Tveggja elskanda ljóð (Les Deux Amants)
 Tveggia elskanda strengleikr (source unknown)
 Tiódels saga (Bisclavret, via Bisclaretz ljóð)
 Tristrams saga ok Ísöndar (Thomas of Britain's Tristan)
 Trójumanna saga (De excidio Troiae)

Composed in Icelandic during the Middle Ages
The following is a probably complete list of original medieval Icelandic chivalric sagas.

Adonias saga
Ála flekks saga
Blómstrvallasaga
Bærings saga
Dámusta saga
Dínus saga drambláta
Drauma-Jóns saga
Ectors saga
Flóres saga konungs ok sona hans
Gibbons saga
Grega saga
Hrings saga ok Tryggva
Jarlmanns saga ok Hermanns
Jóns saga leikara
Kirialax saga
Klári saga
Konráðs saga keisarasonar
Mágus saga jarls
Melkólfs saga ok Solomons konungs
Mírmans saga
Nítíða saga
Nikulás saga leikara
Reinalds saga (now lost, known only from Reinalds rímur og Rósu)
Rémundar saga keisarasonar
Samsons saga fagra
Saulus saga ok Nikanors
Sigrgarðs saga frœkna
Sigrgarðs saga ok Valbrands
Sigurðar saga fóts
Sigurðar saga turnara
Sigurðar saga þögla
Tristrams saga ok Ísoddar
Valdimars saga
Viktors saga ok Blávus
Vilhjálms saga sjóðs
Vilmundar saga viðutan
Þjalar-Jóns saga

Composed in Icelandic after the Middle Ages
Romance sagas continued to be composed in Iceland after the Middle Ages in the tradition of the medieval texts. There are thought to be about 150 post-medieval examples; ten are believed to have been penned, for example, by the priest Jón Oddsson Hjaltalín (1749-1835). The following is an incomplete list:

Ambales saga
Fimmbræðra saga (by Jón Oddsson Hjaltalín)
Jasonar saga bjarta
Sagan af Bernótus Borneyjarkappa (by Jón Oddsson Hjaltalín)
Sagan af Hinriki heilráða (by Jón Oddsson Hjaltalín)
Sagan af Ketlerus keisaraefni (by Jón Oddsson Hjaltalín)
Sagan af Mána fróða (by Jón Oddsson Hjaltalín)
Sagan af Marroni sterka (by Jón Oddsson Hjaltalín)
Sagan af Natoni persíska (by Jón Oddsson Hjaltalín)
Sagan af Reimari keisara og Fal hinum sterka (by Jón Oddsson Hjaltalín)
Sagan af Rígabal og Alkanusi (by Jón Oddsson Hjaltalín)
Sarpidons saga sterka (by Jón Oddsson Hjaltalín)
Úlfhams saga
Úlfs saga Uggasonar

Notes

External links

Riddarasögur: Texts, Translations, and Scholarship
Chivalric tales in old Norse at Heimskringla.no

References
 
 Driscoll, Matthew (2005). "Late Prose Fiction (lygisögur)" in A Companion to Old Norse-Icelandic Literature and Culture pp. 190–204. Blackwell Publishing. 
 
 
 
 Loth, Agnete (1962-5). Late medieval Icelandic romances (5 vols.) Den Arnamagnæanske Komission. Copenhagen.